The Traralgon Tennis International is held in early January each year in Traralgon, in Victoria, Australia. It is considered a lead-up event to the Australian Open's Junior Championships.

It serves as a qualifying tournament for people to become eligible for a Grand Slam.

Past winners include Roger Federer who took the boys title in 1998.

In 2006, Anastasia Pavlyuchenkova won the females title.

References

Tennis tournaments in Australia